Colextran (INN) is a bile acid sequestrant. Chemically, it is an ether of dextran and diethylethanolamine.

References

Bile acid sequestrants